The following highways are numbered 659:

United States